Etonkids International Educational Group (simplified Chinese: 伊顿国际教育集团; traditional Chinese: 伊頓國際教育集團) is an early education and K-12 services provider in the People's Republic of China.

The group operates three kindergarten brands: Etonkids International Kindergarten (simplified Chinese: 伊顿国际幼儿园; Traditional Chinese: 伊頓國際幼兒園); Etonkids Bilingual Kindergarten (Simplified Chinese: 伊顿双语幼儿园; Traditional Chinese: 伊頓雙語幼兒園); and Etonkids Huizhi Kindergarten (Simplified Chinese: 伊顿慧智幼儿园; Traditional Chinese: 伊頓慧智幼兒園).

The group manages kindergarten campuses in major Chinese cities and China's only indigenous American Montessori Society affiliated teacher-credentialing program. The group's headquarters are in Beijing, China.

Group details

History 

Founded in 2002, Etonkids states "our goal is to improve overall early education standards in China through establishing the country’s leading family of kindergartens."

Programs

Etonkids International Kindergarten
Etonkids International Kindergarten features complete English immersion and caters largely to expatiate families in Beijing.

Etonkids Bilingual Kindergarten
Etonkids Bilingual Kindergarten features native English and Chinese speaking teachers in the classroom and hosts a mixture of expatriate and local Chinese and families.

Etonkids Huizhi Kindergarten
Etonkids Huizhi Kindergarten caters largely to local Chinese families seeking international style Montessori bilingual early education.

Other programs
Etonkids campuses offer extra-curricular activities that vary by school term. These include areas of art and dance, various sports and martial arts, themes in ESL and CSL.

Etonkids Beginnings classes are held weekly at Etonkids campuses and are usually centered on a musical or artistic theme in which moms and dads and babies 18 months or younger bond with one another and interact with other families.

Training

Montessori teaching credentials
Etonkids' Montessori teacher credentialing programs are MACTE-accredited and AMS-affiliated, and are offered in both English and Chinese. The course consists of a summer intensive session followed by an academic year-long internship inside a Montessori classroom. The Early Childhood or Nursery Montessori credential is awarded to graduates.

References

External links

 

Educational institutions established in 2002
International schools in Beijing
2002 establishments in China